The Rourke Art Museum is a fine arts museum in Moorhead, Minnesota, United States, founded by James O'Rourke.

The art museum can be found at 521 Main Avenue in a historic Federal Courthouse and Post Office, erected in 1915. The building was included in a study of historic properties in Clay County, which said the building "shows the influence of Federal government function in most towns." It was listed on the National Register of Historic Places in 1980.

Permanent collections
The museum's permanent collections contain more than four-thousand works from an array of cultural and artistic traditions including West African, Islamic, Chinese, Japanese, Pre-Columbian, Contemporary and Colonial Mexican, American Indian, contemporary American, Regionalist, and Pop Art.  Artists whose work is represented include Andy Warhol, James Rosenquist, Jim Dine, Roy Lichtenstein, Allan D'Arcangelo, Robert Rauschenberg, David Gilhooly, Leonard Baskin, Fritz Scholder, Luis Jiménez, Joan Miró, Salvador Dalí, Marc Chagall, Sir William Nicholson, and Adolf Dehn.

References

External links

 Rourke Art Museum - official website

1960 establishments in Minnesota
Art museums established in 1960
Art museums and galleries in Minnesota
Neoclassical architecture in Minnesota
Courthouses on the National Register of Historic Places in Minnesota
Government buildings completed in 1915
Moorhead, Minnesota
Museums in Clay County, Minnesota
Post office buildings on the National Register of Historic Places in Minnesota
National Register of Historic Places in Clay County, Minnesota
1915 establishments in Minnesota